The following is a list of films produced in the Kannada film industry in India in 2003, presented in alphabetical order.

List of Kannada film released

January - June

July - December

References

External links
 Kannada Movies of 2003 at the Internet Movie Database

2003
Lists of 2003 films by country or language
Kannada